The Reunion Tour was a 2007–2008 worldwide concert tour by The Police, marking the 30th anniversary of their beginnings. At its conclusion, the tour became the third (now sixteenth) highest-grossing tour of all time, with revenues reaching over $360 million. The tour began in May 2007 to overwhelmingly positive reviews from fans and critics alike and ended in August 2008 with a final show at Madison Square Garden.

History
On 24 January 2007, Rock101, a radio station in Vancouver, British Columbia, reported the trio was coming together again and had begun tour rehearsals in Vancouver. There were numerous sightings of the group and their entourage in the Vancouver area as expectation built of such a tour.

The reunited Police performed at the 49th Annual Grammy Awards on 11 February 2007 in Los Angeles. On 12 February, The Police held rehearsals and a press conference for the media at the Whisky a Go Go in Los Angeles, where they confirmed they would be undertaking the world tour starting in Vancouver in May. It was also announced the opening act for the North American and European legs of the tour would be Fiction Plane, a pop-rock band from England featuring lead singer and bass guitarist Joe Sumner, the son of Sting. In Philadelphia, Scottish rock band The Fratellis also joined Fiction Plane as an opening act. In addition, Maroon 5 joined the bill in Miami and Maxïmo Park joined The Police and Fiction Plane on the Twickenham dates, London.

Since concert tickets went up for sale worldwide, some concert dates were sold out in minutes. Tickets for the entire British tour, the band's first in 24 years, sold out within 30 minutes. Worldwide, they have sold about 1.5m tickets with revenues reaching $168m.

The Police and Best Buy released a collector's set on 7 October 2008 entitled Certifiable: Live in Buenos Aires, which includes an entire concert recorded live in Buenos Aires, Argentina on the tour. The set came in the following packages: 2DVD/2CD, 1 Blu-ray Disc/2CD, and 3 premium 180-gram vinyl LPs with MP3 file key. The set also included bonus footage, including a documentary shot by Copeland's son Jordan entitled Better Than Therapy.

The tour is a finalist for the Billboard 2008 Touring Awards for Top Tour and Top Draw. The 2008 portions came in fourth in Billboard's grosses rankings for that year.

The show
The first show was a preview concert in Vancouver, for 4,000 members of the band's fan club, on 27 May 2007. The first official show was on 28 May 2007 in front of 22,000 fans at one of two nearly sold-out shows. Opening with "Message in a Bottle", the band performed for roughly two hours, playing mostly hits with a smattering of fan favourites.

While the Vancouver concerts received overwhelmingly positive reviews from critics, drummer Stewart Copeland, in a forum posting on his official site, called the band's 29 May performance "lame" and took humorous pokes at himself and his bandmates. He called one of Sting's song-ending leaps that of a "petulant pansy instead of the god of rock", joked the band botched the key changes so thoroughly they ended up playing "avant-garde twelve-tone hodgepodges" of "Every Little Thing She Does Is Magic" and "Don't Stand So Close to Me", suggested that guitarist Andy Summers was "in Idaho" when he and Sting ended up half a bar out of sync with each other during opener "Message in a Bottle", and claimed he "made a hash" out of a fill he had worked out for in "Walking in Your Footsteps" by playing it in the wrong part of the song. In spite of these glitches, however, he said he was enjoying himself and after the set he and his bandmates fell into each other's arms backstage, laughing.

"It was a sincere criticism," Copeland explained. "If you read the piece in context, it wasn't that vitriolic. It was an acknowledgement that we were only human. And we were struggling to make it work, playing as if our lives depended on it, and we still had to get it right… When Sting and Andy first read it, they were like, 'Oww!' But then they got over it."

"The Police were very good musicians," observed Stranglers bassist Jean-Jacques Burnel. "They just hated each other's guts. They still do, apparently. We played Hyde Park the same day they did (29 June 2008) and it was awful. It's not very conducive to an appreciation of someone's output, when you know they're just there to top up their pension fund."

Stage design

The stage setup for The Police was a simple split-level oval design, ringed with blue lights. Above the stage were seven LED screens—three in the front of the stage, one on each side and two in the rear. The setup was not used during the show in The Woodlands on 20 May 2008 due to the smaller stage at the venue. In Marseille, France on 3 June 2008, the screens were used but not the split-level oval stage setup.

The placement of the band members echoed that of previous tours, with Sting and his bass equipment located stage-right, with Andy Summers and his guitar pedals and amps on stage-left. Stewart Copeland was located in the center rear. Behind him on a platform that could be raised and lowered, was a percussion setup consisting of various timpanis, hanging rotosounds, tuned percussion kits, and digital xylophone centered by a 60" gong used on various songs.

Set list
This set list is representative of the performance in Mountain View on 14 July 2008. It does not represent all concerts for the duration of the tour.

"Message in a Bottle"
"Walking on the Moon" †
"Demolition Man"
"Voices in My Head" †
"When the World Is Running Down, You Make the Best of What's Still Around"
"Don't Stand So Close to Me" †
"Driven to Tears"
"Hole in My Life" †
"Every Little Thing She Does Is Magic"
"Wrapped Around Your Finger" †
"De Do Do Do, De Da Da Da"
"Invisible Sun" †
"Can't Stand Losing You"/"Reggatta de Blanc"
"Roxanne"
"King of Pain"
"So Lonely" †
"Every Breath You Take"
"Next to You"

† – performed in a different key than original album version

Other songs played throughout the tour were "Synchronicity II" and "Walking in Your Footsteps" †. Other songs played in 2007 were "Truth Hits Everybody" †, "The Bed's Too Big Without You", "Spirits in the Material World" †, "Dead End Job" and "Murder by Numbers". All were replaced by "Bring on the Night" in 2008.

Jimi Hendrix's "Purple Haze" and Cream's "Sunshine of Your Love" were added for the final concert on 7 August 2008 at Madison Square Garden.

Tour dates

See also 
 List of highest-grossing concert tours

References

External links
 Official website
 Official webstore
 Reunion Tour interviews and footage

The Police concert tours
2007 concert tours
2008 concert tours
Reunion concert tours